Valentyn Poltavets, (born 18 April 1975 in Dnipropetrovsk, Ukrainian SSR, Soviet Union, now Ukraine), is a Ukrainian football midfielder. Besides Ukraine, he has played in Switzerland.

Honours as player
 Swiss Cup Winner: 2003/04
 Ukrainian Premier League Runner-up: bronze (2): 2000–01, 2005–06

References

External links
 Stats on Odessa Football

1975 births
Living people
Footballers from Dnipro
Ukrainian footballers
FC Chornomorets Odesa players
FC Arsenal Kyiv players
FC Wil players
FC Metalurh Zaporizhzhia players
FC Dnipro players
FC Dnister Ovidiopol players
Ukrainian Premier League players
Swiss Super League players
Ukrainian expatriate footballers
Expatriate footballers in Switzerland
Ukrainian expatriate sportspeople in Switzerland
Association football midfielders
Ukrainian Cup top scorers
FC Balkany Zorya players